Zhangiella is a genus of hydrozoans belonging to the family Australomedusidae.

Species:

Zhangiella bitentaculata 
Zhangiella condensum 
Zhangiella dongshanensis 
Zhangiella nanhainense

References

Hydrozoan genera
Australomedusidae